Lazurnoye is a rural locality (a selo) in Volokonovsky District, Belgorod Oblast, Russia. The population was 85 as of 2010. There are 2 streets.

Geography 
Lazurnoye is located 21 km east of Volokonovka (the district's administrative centre) by road. Pokrovka is the nearest rural locality.

References 

Rural localities in Volokonovsky District